Football is the most popular sport, both in terms of participants and spectators, in the Argentine capital of Buenos Aires. Buenos Aires has one of the highest concentration of football teams of any city in the world (featuring at least 24 professional football teams), with many of its teams playing in the top tier Primera División. This has led to the development of several rivalries within the city, contested as "derbys" when the regular league schedule brings these teams together, such as the Superclásico between Boca Juniors and River Platedeemed one of the "50 sporting things you must do before you die" by The Observer. Other major clubs include Vélez Sarsfield,  Ferro Carril Oeste and Argentinos Juniors.

Diego Maradona, born in Lanús Partido (county), outside of the city of Buenos Aires but in its metropolitan area, is widely considered one of the greatest football players of all time. Maradona started his career with Argentinos Juniors, later playing for Boca Juniors, the Argentina national football team and others (most notably FC Barcelona in Spain and SSC Napoli in Italy).

Professional Clubs

Honours 
 Argentina football champion (68)
 River Plate(36)
 Boca Juniors(32)

Buenos Aires derby 
 Superclásico: River Plate vs. Boca Juniors

Stadiums 
 Estadio Monumental Antonio Vespucio Liberti: Hosted the 1978 FIFA World Cup Final

Locations of teams

References